The 1895 Illinois Fighting Illini football team was an American football team that represented the University of Illinois during the 1895 college football season.  In their first season under head coach George Huff, the Illini compiled a 4–2–1 record. Fullback Robert J. Hotchkiss was the team captain.

Schedule

Roster

Source: University of Illinois

References

Illinois
Illinois Fighting Illini football seasons
Illinois Fighting Illini football